Mouchoir Bank, in Spanish also called Banco de Pañuelo Blanco, is a submerged bank that is part of the Turks and Caicos Islands and falls within its exclusive economic zone.

The bank, located southeast of the Turks islands, is the geographic continuation of the carbonate island archipelago comprising the Bahamas, Turks and Caicos Islands, the Silver Bank, and the Navidad Bank.

Geography
Much of the north side of the bank is awash in two groupings of coral reef. A 1.8 m deep rock lies between the two groupings. There are numerous shallow patches on the bank which break. North East Breaker is a dangerous rock in the northeast.

The bank covers an area of 960 km2. Silver Bank Passage separates Mouchoir Bank from Silver Bank further southeast; the latter belongs to the Dominican Republic's EEZ.

See also
Silver Bank
Navidad Bank

References

External links
Sailing Directions, Caribbean Sea Vol. I

Undersea banks of the Caribbean Sea
Geography of the Turks and Caicos Islands